Arizona Nights is a 1927 American silent Western film directed by Lloyd Ingraham and starring Fred Thomson, Nora Lane, and William Courtright.

Cast
 Fred Thomson as Fred Coulter 
 Nora Lane as Ruth Browning 
 J.P. McGowan as Jeff Decker 
 William Courtright as Bill Barrow 
 Lottie Williams as Aunt Agatha 
 Merrill McCormick as Speed Lester 
 Dan Peterson as Red Dog

References

Bibliography
 Donald W. McCaffrey & Christopher P. Jacobs. Guide to the Silent Years of American Cinema. Greenwood Publishing, 1999.

External links
 

1927 films
1927 Western (genre) films
American black-and-white films
Films directed by Lloyd Ingraham
Film Booking Offices of America films
Silent American Western (genre) films
1920s English-language films
1920s American films